Reframing may refer to:

 Cognitive reframing
 Reframing (filmmaking)
 Making a picture frame again

See also
Frame (disambiguation)